Tesdorpf is a surname. Notable people with the surname include:

Denmark
 Edward Tesdorpf, landowner and sugar manufacturer

Germany

 Tesdorpf Family 

 Burkhard Tesdorpf
 Ebba Tesdorpf